The following is a list of professional wrestling attendance records in the Canada. The list is dominated by the American professional wrestling promotion World Wrestling Entertainment which has controlled the industry in North America since 2002. As the World Wrestling Federation, it became the first national promotion in the U.S. during the 1980s wrestling boom. The company forced Canada's three major promotions, Lutte Internationale, Maple Leaf Wrestling, and Stampede Wrestling, out of business during this period.

Canadian Athletic Promotions / International Wrestling Alliance, which controlled the National Wrestling Alliance's Quebec wrestling territory during the late 1940s and 1950s, still holds the most records of any province. Only nine of the attendances listed are from non-Canadian promotions, all exclusively held by WWE. Two of these are from WWE's flagship WrestleMania pay-per-view (PPV) event with 1990's Wrestlemania VI attracting 64,287 fans and grossing more than $3.4 million, the highest paid attendance for a pro wrestling show in North America. In addition, the February 8, 1999 edition of WWF Raw is the most attended taping in the show's history outside the United States. All of the events have been held in the Eastern Canada, with eight in Toronto, Ontario and twenty-three in Montreal, Quebec.

Events and attendances

Historical

Footnotes

References
General
 
 
 
 
 

Specific

External links
List of professional wrestling attendance records in Canada at Wrestlingdata.com

Professional wrestling attendances
Professional wrestling shows
Professional wrestling in Canada